Yves Demaria (born 22 January 1972) is a French former professional motocross racer. He is a three-time FIM Motocross World Champion in the MX3-GP class for motorcycles displacing 650cc.

Biography
Born in Marseille, France, Demaria won his first MX3 world championship in 2004, following with two more crowns in 2006 and 2007. He has also won Grands Prix races in the MX1-GP and MX2-GP classes. Demaria was a member of the victorious French 2001 Motocross des Nations team that included David Vuillemin and Luigi Séguy.

References 

Living people
1972 births
Sportspeople from Marseille
French motocross riders